The 1904 New York Highlanders season, the team's second, finished with the team in second place in the American League with a record of 92–59. The team was managed by Clark Griffith and played home games at Hilltop Park.

Offseason 
 October 6, 1903: Jack O'Connor was traded by the Highlanders to the St. Louis Browns for John Anderson.
 January 5, 1904: Eddie Quick and Jack Zalusky were traded by the Highlanders to the Toledo Mud Hens for Red Kleinow.

Regular season

The name 
The first verified use of the alternate nickname "Yankees" (a synonym for "Americans", the team being American Leaguers) occurred on April 7, 1904, when a spring training story from Richmond, Virginia carried the headline "Yankees Will Start Home From South To-Day."  The New York Evening Journal screamed: "YANKEES BEAT BOSTON". The casual use of that nickname suggests it was already in the popular lexicon, although "Highlanders" would continue to be the primary (and equally unofficial) nickname for several more years.

Season summary 
The Highlanders were in the thick of the American League pennant race throughout the season, leading by two games as late as September 20. This led to the New York Giants announcement that they would not play in the World Series, since they considered the Highlanders to be only a "minor league" team.

On the final day of the season at Hilltop Park, New York pitcher Jack Chesbro threw a wild pitch in the ninth inning, giving the Boston Americans the win, and the 1904 AL pennant. Even though it was Boston who stole the pennant on the final day, the Giants stuck to their word and their refusal prevented the World Series from being played.

It would be a century later, in 2004, the next time Boston directly eliminated the Yankees from title contention, when they did so in the final game of the 2004 ALCS, a hundred years later in a repeat of sorts of the events of that year, the beginning of a long rivalry between the two clubs.

Season standings

Record vs. opponents

Roster

Player stats

Batting

Starters by position 
Note: Pos = Position; G = Games played; AB = At bats; H = Hits; Avg. = Batting average; HR = Home runs; RBI = Runs batted in

Other batters 
Note: G = Games played; AB = At bats; H = Hits; Avg. = Batting average; HR = Home runs; RBI = Runs batted in

Pitching

Starting pitchers 
Note: G = Games pitched; IP = Innings pitched; W = Wins; L = Losses; ERA = Earned run average; SO = Strikeouts

Other pitchers 
Note: G = Games pitched; IP = Innings pitched; W = Wins; L = Losses; ERA = Earned run average; SO = Strikeouts

Awards and honors

Records 
 Jack Chesbro and Jack Powell, American League record, combined victories by two teammate pitchers (64)

Franchise records 
 Jack Chesbro, Yankees single season record, most wins in a season (41)

References 

1904 New York Highlanders team page at www.baseball-almanac.com
1904 New York Highlanders at Baseball Reference

New York Yankees seasons
New York Highlanders
New York Highlanders
1900s in Manhattan
Washington Heights, Manhattan